Rohan Ahern (born 15 June 1988) is an Australian former professional rugby league footballer who played NRL for the Sydney roosters and the Brisbane Broncos.

Playing career
A North St Josephs junior, He made his debut for the Sydney Roosters in Round 4, 2009, playing 4 games that season. An aspiring raw talent,  he signed with the Brisbane Broncos for the 2010 and 2011 seasons, he played 2 games for the Broncos before an anterior cruciate ligament (ACL) knee injury early in the season prevented him from playing for the remainder of the year.

In October 2011, Ahern signed with North Queensland Cowboys and played for their feeder team the Mackay Cutters in the Queensland Cup. once again a season ending injury prevented him from playing the season and forced his retirement of the NRL.

Post playing
In 2012, Ahern undertook 4 year Diesel Fitting Apprenticeship which he completed.

Ahern now works as a Diesel Fitter.

References

External links
Sydney Roosters player profile

1988 births
Living people
Australian rugby league players
Sydney Roosters players
Norths Devils players
Mackay Cutters players
Rugby league locks
Rugby league second-rows
People educated at Padua College (Brisbane)
Rugby league players from Brisbane